West Virginia Route 501 is a two-lane west–east connector route. It is known as Big Tyler Road, and starts at the unincorporated community of Tyler Mountain, splitting off from WV Route 62. From there it crosses over Tyler Mountain, and ends at the community of Tyler Heights, where WV Route 622 comes out and meets it. The rest of the community past that is on Route 622.

WV 501 was formerly County Route 5, which included the part of WV 622 extending back to WV 62 at Cross Lanes.

Major intersections

501
Transportation in Kanawha County, West Virginia